Josef Wehrli (born 3 December 1954) is a Swiss former professional racing cyclist. He rode in one edition of the Tour de France, three editions of the Giro d'Italia and one edition of the Vuelta a España.

References

External links
 

1954 births
Living people
Swiss male cyclists
People from Einsiedeln
Sportspeople from the canton of Schwyz